Hilmi Salem (Arabic:حلمي سالم) was an Egyptian poet. He was born in 1951 (in Menofia Governorate in Egypt) and died on 28 July 2012.

Education and career 
He is considered one of the most prominent poets in Egypt in the 1970s. He obtained a BA in Journalism from the Faculty of Arts at Cairo University, and he worked as a journalist for Al-Ahali newspaper published in Cairo, and the editor-in-chief of the Egyptian Cultural Intellectual and Literature Magazine.  And the Editor-in-chief of the Rainbow Cultural Magazine. He is the recipient of the Excellence Award in Literature for the year 2006 for his entire literary work. Hilmi Salem was associated with the poetic group "Illumination", which was accompanied by "Aswat"/(voices), one of the most famous poetry factions in the seventies, and among its poets Hilmi Salem, Hassan Talab, Jamal Al-Qassas, Rifaat Salam, Amjad Rayan and Mahmoud Naseem.

The Balcony of Laila Murad 
In the winter of 2007, he published a poem entitled "Leila Murad's Balcony" that had previously been published in his poetry collection entitled "Praising of weakness" in the Cairo art magazine "Ibdaa" headed by the poet Ahmed Abdel Moati Hegazy. However, at that time, the head of the Egyptian General Book Authority issued a decision to withdraw copies of the issue from the market when he saw that some of the poem's contents "offends the divine self." As a result, the Islamic Research Academy (one of Al-Azhar institutions) accused him of "atheism and blasemphy" and he was to be subjected to a campaign calling for his "repentance", after a statement of the matter was signed by about a hundred Islamic personalities, only to be criticized by Egyptian intellectuals, describing it as "an apostasy campaign and the culture of terror". In April 2008, the Egyptian Administrative Court issued a court ruling demanding the Ministry of Culture not to award the Excellence Award to the poet Hilmi Salem, on the grounds that he insulted the divine self.

Then Sheikh Youssef Al-Badri, a member of the Islamic Research Academy of Al-Azhar, filed a lawsuit against the Egyptian Minister of Culture Farouk Hosni and the Secretary-General of the Supreme Council for Culture Ali Abu Shady, asking them to implement the decision to withdraw the award given to Hilmi Salem. However, as was mentioned in Al-Hayat newspaper, the implementation of the decision was "ruled out" on the grounds that none of Farouk Hosni and Ali Abu Shadi issued a decision granting Hilmi Salem the prize, since the decision came from a specialized committee in the Supreme Council of Culture and based on a voting process among the members of the Council. Later in the same month, the Supreme Council of Culture appealed the court's decision, and the Secretary-General of the Supreme Council of Culture described the appeal as a "call for enlightenment and the fight against obscurantism that stops all creative work."

From his side, Hilmi Salem said that he did not ask the Ministry of Culture to appeal the ruling or appeal, adding that he "believes that he has already won the award". In his response about the accusation that the poem offends the divine self, Salem denied the accusation, adding. In the poem, I criticized the Muslims ’dependence on God and their inactivity. This is a religious meaning mentioned in the Holy Qur’an, where the Almighty God said (God does not change the condition of a people until they change what they are themselves) .. The poem said this meaning in a simple poetic form, which is not used by all those who read literature a narrow literal reading ...".

Books 

 Culture under Siege (Beirut) 1984
 Chord and Players 1990
 Come to the Father: Essays on Discrimination and Receipt in Poetry, 1992
 Living the Right Way 1998
 Wisdom of the Egyptians (jointly) 2000
 Modernity is the Sister of Tolerance: Contemporary Arabic Poetry and Human Rights 2001
 Good Morning, Winged Falcon: A Study of Amal Dunqul's Poetry
 Silencer Culture 2003
 Lebanon's Flaming Summer 2007
 Aiming at the Brain: Words on Freedom and Repression.
 Leila Mourad's Balcony Trial

Collection of his Diwan Poetry 
Hilmi Salem has more than 18 poetry collections, including:

 My Love is Planted in the Earth's Blood 1974
 Alexandrian Is Pain 1981
 The Middeteranian1984
 Biography of Beirut 1986
 Biological and Neighboring 1988
 The Maze and the Brutal Summer 1990
 Jurisprudence of Pleasure 1992
 Endocardium and Maryamata, 1994
 Knitted Mirage 1996
 The One One 1997
 There are Blind People Here, 2001
 Holy Stone Greetings 2003
 Armed Love 2005
 Lady of the well’s Birthday 2005
 Brain stroke Pros, 2006
 Pigeon on Bint Jbeil 2007
 Praising Vulnerability 2007

Some of his Poems 

 Liver
 Last vision
 Alternative
 Presence
 Difficult

References 

Egyptian poets
21st-century Egyptian writers
Egyptian critics
1951 births
2012 deaths